National Cycle Network (NCN) Route 169 is a Sustrans Regional Route that runs through Scunthorpe . It is also known as the Scunthorpe Ridgeway.

History 
Construction of the path is the realisation of a dream of Sir Patrick Abercombie, the famous planner who once worked in town planning in Scunthorpe. A path along the Ridgeway has been in place since the 1970s. It was developed into a NCN route with the construction of two bridges. The first bridge opened in 2011 and spanned Bridges Road. Opened the following year, the second crosses West Common Lane.

Route 
The northern trailhead is at Normanby Hall Country Park. It runs south through Crosby and Hempdykes to Riddings and its southern trailhead at Greenacre Park Bottesford with an extension from Manor Park completed in May 2022. The route follows a north-south jurassic escarpment.

Related NCN routes 
NCN 169 is isolated from the rest of the National Cycle Network.

References

External links
 Route 169 on the Sustrans website.

Cycleways in England